Haldi is a village in Hiiumaa Parish, Hiiu County in northwestern Estonia.

The village is first mentioned in 1798 (Halti). Historically, the village was part of Emmaste Manor.

References
 

Villages in Hiiu County